Redwood and Wildfire is Andrea Hairston's second novel. It centers on the main characters Redwood and Aidan and their travel from Georgia to Chicago at the turn of the 20th century. It was published in 2011 by Aqueduct Press.

Awards
 2011 James Tiptree, Jr. Award
 2011 Carl Brandon Society Award

References

2011 American novels
James Tiptree Jr. Award-winning works